Eileen Scanlon  (born 1951) is a British academic who is Regius Professor of Open Education at the Open University.

Early life and education
Scanlon was born in 1951. She is a graduate of the University of Glasgow and the Open University.

Career and research
Scanlon became co-director of the Centre for Research in Education and Educational Technology (CREET) at the Open University in 2004. She directed the Computer Assisted Learning Research Group for many years and has worked on a range of educational technology research and development projects, many of them focussing on science learning. Her current interests include education, computing, mobile learning for formal and informal learning of science, and developing pedagogies for technology enhanced learning.

In January 2013, she was appointed to the new Regius Professorship in Open Education at the Open University

Awards and honours
In the 2016 Birthday Honours, Scanlon was appointed Officer of the Order of the British Empire (OBE) "for services to education". In 2016, she was elected a Fellow of the Academy of Social Sciences (FAcSS).

References

Living people
Academics of the Open University
Officers of the Order of the British Empire
British educational theorists
Fellows of the Academy of Social Sciences
1951 births